The Frillback is a breed of pigeon developed over many years of selective breeding. Frillbacks, along with other varieties of domesticated pigeons, are all descendants from the rock pigeon (Columba livia).
The breed is known for the frill or curls on the wing shield feathers. The feather curl should also be present at the ends of the foot feathers or muffs.

The standards of a pure American Frillback 

The quality of a Frillback is based on a 100-point scale, with the head constituting 15 points, the color constituting 15 points, the body constituting 10 points, the curl constituting 50 points, and the muff constituting 10 points.

The colors of standard Frillbacks fall into six color categories.
 Self – white, black, recessive red, yellow
 Pattern – recessive red mottle, yellow mottle, rosewing, whiteside
 Grizzle – red, yellow, blue, silver
 Shield marked – red, yellow, blue-black bar, silver-dun bar, mealy ash-red bar, ash-cream bar
 ARC – Any rare color
 ARCP – Any rare color pattern

ARC and ARCP Frillbacks must be entered by at least 3 exhibitors in 3 of 5 American Frillback shows for 3 years, with judging score progress, before it is deemed appropriate.
Frillbacks produce many different colors that are not recognized by the AFC because they are not standard and do not reproduce consistently. Frillbacks can carry numerous colors in many different patterns such as pied. These colors are not recognized as standard but are very common.

Size
Frillbacks are slightly larger than other colored pigeon breeds, with long tail and wing feathers.

Head
Shell-crest and plain-head are found in all colors of Frillbacks.
A plain-headed Frillback should have a slightly oval head with no flat areas and a forehead that has a distinct stop at the wattle.
A shell-crested Frillback should have a thick shell crest on the back of the head with rosettes on each side. The crest should stand off the head.

Eyes
The eyes should be in line with the beak. A reddish-orange is desired in all colors except shield marked. Shield marked desire a black or "bull-eye". While pearl, gravel, and cracked eyes occur, they are not desirable and are considered major faults.

Beak
The beak of a Frillback is long, with the upper beak often being slightly longer than the lower beak. The beak is dark on red and blue grizzles, black on blacks, light on yellow, horn on silver, and flesh colored on all other standard colors. The wattle is thin and white on all colors.

Muff
The muff of a Frillback will vary, however, 2 to 3 inches is a desirable length.

Frill
The curl of a Frillback covers its entire wing shield. No areas should be uncovered. The last row of curls spans the entire length of the wing. Frills form a distinct ringlet curl at the end. The bottom of the muff is also frilled. Tail and flight feathers have a distinct wrinkle.

See also 

List of pigeon breeds

References

The Frillback Standard, The American Frillback Club, 2009.

Pigeon breeds